Plesiobalaenoptera is a genus of extinct rorqual which existed in Italy during the late Miocene epoch. The type species is P. quarantellii. It is the oldest known rorqual from the Mediterranean basin.

Description
 
Plesiobalaenoptera was similar in appearance to other rorquals, although it had a relatively wider rostrum than other whales. The genus has several distinguishing features mainly seen in the region of the ear. For example, the periotic bone (which surrounds the inner ear) has a raised central portion and a triangular projection at its front. Like all baleen whales, the tympanic bulla, which surrounds the middle ear, is enlarged and separate from the periotic bone. However, its tympanic bulla has a distinctive high keel. Moreover, the opening of the Eustachian tube into the middle ear is in a high position.

Paleobiology

Unlike living rorquals, Plesiobalaenoptera was probably not capable of ram feeding. During ram feeding, modern whales swim toward their prey with open mouths and engulf them in an expandable throat. Plesiobalaenoptera has a postcoronoid fossa, or hole in the dentary bone of the lower jaw, which would have made this method of feeding difficult to perform.

Classification
Plesiobalaenoptera is closely related to Parabalaenoptera, known from the late Miocene of California in the United States. The two form a clade that is the sister taxon of crown balaenopterids, which includes the last common ancestor of the living Balaenoptera and Megaptera, and all of its descendants.

References

Miocene cetaceans
Prehistoric mammals of Europe
Prehistoric cetacean genera
Fossil taxa described in 2010